SS Statendam was a 10,322 ton (gross) ship of the Holland America Line, built by Harland and Wolff, launched in 1898 and completed on 18 August 1898.  She was sold to the Allan Line in 1911 and renamed SS Scotian. The Allan Line was taken over in 1917 by Canadian Pacific Line, who continued to operate her as the Scotian until 1922, when she was renamed SS Marglen.  She was scrapped in 1927.

References

Ships of the Holland America Line
Steamships
1898 ships
Ships built in Belfast
Ships of CP Ships
Ships built by Harland and Wolff
Ocean liners of Canada